The Cigarette Girl from the Future is the debut EP release by the indie band Beauty Pill.

Track listing
"Rideshare" – 4:21
"The Cigarette Girl from the Future" – 3:43
"The Idiot Heart" – 4:52
"Bone White Crown Victoria" – 4:46
"Here Lies Rachel Wallace" – 5:15

Personnel
Chad Clark - Vocals, Guitar, Treatments
Joanne Gholl - Vocals, Bass, Guitar
Abram Goodrich - Drums, Bass, Guitar
Jerry Busher- Trumpet on "The Cigarette Girl From the Future"

Additional personnel
Mixing - Chad Clark
Mastering - Charlie Pilsner
Illustration & Design - Kelley Bell

Details
Ryan Nelson joined a few months after this EP was recorded, hence his work is not featured on this release.

Beauty Pill albums
2001 debut EPs